Ethan Michael Kilmer (born January 31, 1983) is a former American football safety of the National Football League (NFL). He was drafted by the Cincinnati Bengals in the seventh round of the 2006 NFL Draft. He played college football at Penn State.

Kilmer was also a member of the Miami Dolphins prior to the 2009 season before his retirement.

Early years
Kilmer excelled in two sports at Wyalusing Valley Junior/Senior High School in Wyalusing, Pennsylvania; neither of those sports, however, was football. (He excelled at track and basketball.)

College career

Shippensburg
He enrolled at Shippensburg University in 2001 with the intention of competing in track and field, however Kilmer's eventual decision to study kinesiology made a transfer to Penn State necessary.

Penn State
At Penn State, Kilmer joined the Nittany Lions football program as a walk-on, eventually working his way into a starting position. His best game came during Penn State's triple overtime win over Florida State in the  2006 Orange Bowl, when he caught six passes for 79 yards and a touchdown. He earned a Bachelor of Science in Kinesiology there in 2006.

Professional career

Cincinnati Bengals
Kilmer was selected by the Cincinnati Bengals in the seventh round (209th overall) of the 2006 NFL draft. He was listed as a safety on the Bengals' roster but also spent time learning cornerback and wide receiver. Additionally, Kilmer played a great deal of special teams during the 2006 season.  He scored his first NFL touchdown on Week 11 against the New Orleans Saints, intercepting a Drew Brees pass and returning it 52 yards.

Kilmer suffered a thigh injury during the 2008 preseason. He was waived/injured on August 20 and reverted to injured reserve after clearing waivers. He was released with an injury settlement on October 9.

Miami Dolphins
After spending most of the 2008 season out of football, Kilmer signed with the Miami Dolphins on January 19, 2009. He chose to leave the team on August 7.

References

1983 births
Living people
People from Towanda, Pennsylvania
Players of American football from Pennsylvania
American football wide receivers
American football cornerbacks
American football safeties
Penn State Nittany Lions football players
Cincinnati Bengals players
Miami Dolphins players